Viktória Csáki (born 3 March 1986) is a retired Hungarian handballer.

She got acquainted with handball in the school at the age of ten, and two years later she was already playing for local club TVSE. She was signed by Debreceni VSC at the age of fourteen and made her senior debut in the 2002–2003 season.  However, she was yet unable to break into the first team and has been sent to Tajtavill-Derecske to gain more playing minutes and experience. After her comeback she rose through the ranks quickly, and from 2006 until her leave in 2011 she was considered a regular first team player. In December 2011 Csáki switched to French top club Metz Handball.

Csáki made her international debut on 4 April 2006 against Norway. She participated at the 2010 European Championship, where Hungary finished tenth.

Achievements
Nemzeti Bajnokság I:
Silver Medallist: 2010, 2011
Bronze Medallsit: 2009
Magyar Kupa:
Silver Medallist: 2009, 2011
Bronze Medallist: 2008
World University Championship:
Winner: 2010

References

External links
 Viktória Csáki career statistics at Worldhandball

1986 births
Living people
Hungarian female handball players
Sportspeople from Szabolcs-Szatmár-Bereg County
Expatriate handball players
Hungarian expatriates in France
Békéscsabai Előre NKSE players
Fehérvár KC players